The Baltimore Colts were a National Football League franchise from 1953 until 1984, when they relocated to Indianapolis.

Baltimore Colts may also refer to:

 Baltimore Colts (1947–1950), a franchise in the All-America Football Conference (1947–1949) and National Football League (1950) that disbanded after the 1950 season
 Indianapolis Colts, the current incarnation of the former Baltimore Colts (1953–1983) franchise
 Baltimore Stallions, earlier the Baltimore CFL Colts, a Canadian Football League team based in Baltimore from 1994 to 1995

See also
History of the Indianapolis Colts
Baltimore Ravens, Baltimore's current NFL team